Tompkinsville-Monroe County Airport  is a public use airport located two nautical miles (4 km) northeast of the central business district of Tompkinsville, a city in Monroe County, Kentucky, United States. It is included in the National Plan of Integrated Airport Systems for 2011–2015, which categorized it as a general aviation facility.

Although most U.S. airports use the same three-letter location identifier for the FAA and IATA, this airport is assigned TZV by the FAA but has no designation from the IATA.

Facilities and aircraft
Tompkinsville-Monroe County Airport covers an area of 120 acres (49 ha) at an elevation of 1,036 feet (316 m) above mean sea level. It has one runway designated 4/22 with an asphalt surface measuring 4,000 by 75 feet (1,219 x 23 m).

For the 12-month period ending May 10, 2012, the airport had 5,395 aircraft operations, an average of 14 per day: 90% general aviation, 9% air taxi, and 1% military. At that time there were 22 single-engine aircraft based at this airport.

References

External links
 Tompkinsville Aviation, a fixed-base operator (FBO)
 Aerial image as of March 1997 from USGS The National Map
 
 

Airports in Kentucky
Transportation in Monroe County, Kentucky
Buildings and structures in Monroe County, Kentucky